Khan Qeshlaqi (also Romanized as Khān Qeshlāqī; also known as Qā’emābād) is a village in Mehmandust Rural District, Kuraim District, Nir County, Ardabil Province, Iran. At the 2006 census, its population was 258, in 55 families.

References 

Towns and villages in Nir County